Osvaldo Fattori (22 June 1922 – 27 December 2017) was an Italian association footballer who played as a defender or midfielder.

Club career
Fattori was born  in San Michele Extra, Verona. After having been a player for Audace San Michele, which later gave rise to Mariolino Corso, Fattori moved to Vicenza, making his Serie A debut as the club's starting defensive midfielder. In 1946 he went to Sampdoria, which acquired him (along with Bassetto) for a record 10 million lira after exhaustive bargaining with Inter. He would get to Inter in the summer of 1947 after only 12 months with Sampdoria. With Inter, Fattori would stay for seven seasons winning two championships in 1953 and 1954.

International career
At international level, Fattori earned four caps for the national team, including the win against Paraguay in the 1950 World Cup.

See also
Progression of the most expensive transfer in Serie A

References

External links
Trenta uomini in barca. I mondiali di calcio Brasile 1950

1922 births
2017 deaths
Italian footballers
Association football forwards
L.R. Vicenza players
U.C. Sampdoria players
Inter Milan players
Brescia Calcio players
Serie A players
Serie B players
Italy international footballers
1950 FIFA World Cup players
Association football defenders
Italy B international footballers
Footballers from Verona